Mariestella Cañedo Racal (born September 22, 1997), popularly known as Maris Racal, is a Filipino actress, singer-songwriter, host, and vlogger. She came to prominence in 2014 after joining Pinoy Big Brother: All In where she placed second. Racal grew up in a musically inclined family and learned to sing and play instruments at a young age. She can play the guitar, piano, ukulele, and beatbox, some of which she learned on her own by watching various videos online. Aside from being a musician and singer, she also excels in painting, song/poem writing, acting and dancesport.

After her stint in Pinoy Big Brother, Racal signed a deal with Star Magic. In February 2016, she was introduced as one of the members of the all-girl dance group, Girltrends.

On January 22, 2017, Racal was officially launched as one of the members of ASAP's sing-and-dance group, BFF5.

Early life and education
Mariestella C. Racal grew up in Davao del Norte and graduated high school from St. Mary's College in Tagum City. She is the 5th of 6 siblings in a musically-inclined family. In school, she used to sing the responsorial psalm, sing in mass and sing intermission numbers. She also did cover songs on SoundCloud.

Maris Racal dreams of becoming a doctor and plans to juggle show business and studying. She attended Trinity University of Asia taking up medical technology but had to stop due to her busy schedule.

Career
After PBB, Racal was launched as part of Star Magic Circle 2014 and had been quickly molded as a budding actress, starting off on TV show Hawak Kamay followed by several more stints on TV shows like Maalaala Mo Kaya, Ipaglaban Mo!, Oh My G!, and Ningning, and on films like Halik sa Hangin, Just The Way You Are, and The Breakup Playlist. She also starred with Roberto "Fourth" Solomon Pagotan IV in the 'Dear MOR' episode, the "Kate and Red Story".

Racal released her first single "Tanong Mo Sa Bituin" in April 2015 as part of Star Record's compilation album "OPM Fresh".

In June 2015, Racal was cast in her first main lead role on the big screen as Elena in Tandem Entertainment's film Stars Versus Me, which also starred Manolo Pedrosa as her leading man.

In February 2016, Racal was introduced as one of the members of all-girl dance group "Girltrends" in the noontime show It's Showtime. She was then tagged as "Magnificent Girltrend Maris" and became the group's Team Young member. Maris subsequently played Jenny Bonanza in the teleserye We Will Survive later in the month.

In October 2016, Racal performed in her first OneMusicPH's Digital Concert dubbed as "Double Hearts" (together with co-performers Loisa Andalio, Sue Ramirez and Kristel Fulgar), where she debuted her original song Take It All Away. In the same month, Maris appeared in the film The Third Party as Joan.

In December 2016, Racal became notable as Maxine in the 2016 Metro Manila Film Festival's box office entry film Vince and Kath and James.

In January 2017, Racal was launched as one of the members of ASAP's new all-girl song-and-dance group, known as BFF5 (pronounced as BFFs), along with Ylona Garcia, Andrea Brillantes, Loisa Andalio and Kira Balinger. Inclusion in the new group led Maris to leave her previous group Girltrends. Later in the month, Maris started her guest appearance as Rona, Carreon's daughter, in the hit primetime TV series FPJ's Ang Probinsyano.

By April 2017, Racal starred as Fairy Sylvia in weekend primetime series Wansapanataym Presents: Annika PINTAsera. Later in the month, Maris was entrusted with Ikaw Lang Ang Iibigin theme song "Paano Mo Nalaman", the tagalized version of the song 'How Did You Know'.

On July 8, 2017, Racal held her first major concert together with Loisa, Sue and Kristel titled 4 Of A Kind: The Un4gettable Concert at the Music Museum. Maris was also one of the cast in the horror-thriller film Bloody Crayons, playing the role of Richalaine Alcantara, that was released on cinemas by July 12, 2017.

In November 2017, Racal join the cast of Hanggang Saan as Nessa, and paired with Yves Flores.

In December 2017, Racal became part of Regal Films's official entry film Haunted Forest with Jane Oineza, Jameson Blake and Jon Lucas on 2017 Metro Manila Film Festival.

On February 8, 2018, Racal headlined the first-ever Star Events FanCon held at Teatrino, Promenade with Iñigo Pascual as her special guest. "Tala", Maris' original song, was also released as her newest single during the event.

A few days later, Racal debuted as the co-host of Iñigo Pascual's online show, One Music POPSSSS, appearing on the show's Season 4 pilot episode.

In May 2018, her latest single "Ikaw Lang Sapat Na" launched as the sub-theme song of the teleserye Since I Found You on Primetime Bida.

In September 2018, Racal became a certified recording artist with the release of her first album entitled "Stellar".

In October 2018, Racal was launched as one of the 10 interpreters of Himig Handog 2018 with a song of Jan Sabili from Muntinlupa entitled "Sugarol".

In 2020, following the loss of ABS-CBN's franchise in the middle of the ongoing pandemic, Racal temporarily went to blocktimer shows that are aired on TV5 such as Sunday Noontime Live! and Stay-In Love. Racal returned to ASAP on April 18, 2021, following an appearance on Pinoy Big Brother: Connect's Big Night in March 2021.

Music career
In July 2014, the PBB All In housemates including Maris Racal released their "Pinoy Big Brother: All In - Originals" album, composed of three songs (Teen Love Song, Turtle Song, and Bibimbap) originally written and sung by them.

On October 28, 2014, she uploaded her cover of Ed Sheeran's "Thinking Out Loud" song on her official YouTube account. The hashtag 'Thinking Out Loud Cover by Maris Racal' immediately trended worldwide on Twitter as her fans expressed their delight with her cover song. The video has already garnered almost two million of hits on YouTube since it was uploaded.

In February–March 2015, Racal shared her video blogs on YouTube known as "Maris My Song For You" episodes (with the direction of Alco Guerrero) where she gave her fans an opportunity to send her their messages and ask her to breathe new life to their favorite song. Her MMSFY episodes started from her cover of songs In My Life and True Colors followed by more cover songs like Firework, Yellow, Lost Stars, 'Til There Was You and Ordinary People.

In April 2015, Racal released her first single, "Tanong Mo Sa Bituin", part of Star Record's compilation album, "OPM Fresh". This song became the official soundtrack of the film "Stars Versus Me".

In August 2015, Racal covered Norah Jones' hit song "Don't Know Why" during the #HappyBirthdayWish1075 celebration. Her exclusive performance made her won the awards "Wishers’ Choice for Wishclusive Performance of the Year" and "Wishers’ Choice for Young Artist of the Year" in the 2016 Wish 107.5 Music Awards dated January 26, 2016, held at Smart Araneta Coliseum,.

On October 2, 2016, Racal was one of the four singers/performers (the others being Loisa Andalio, Sue Ramirez, and Kristel Fulgar) who headlined OneMusicPH's Double Hearts Digital Concert where she debuted her original song, Take It All Away.

During Kimerald's Ikaw Lang ang Iibigin Grand Media Day press conference on April 24, 2017, Maris performed the Tagalog version of the song "How Did You Know". Maris' "Paano Mo Nalaman" became one of the main theme songs of the daytime series Ikaw Lang ang Iibigin which aired on May 1, 2017.

On February 8, 2018, Racal released her newest single entitled "Tala" during her FanCon.

Few months after, May 4, 2018, she also released her latest single "Ikaw Lang Sapat Na",  the song that she wrote for Inigo on their GGV guesting. Few weeks after it became the sub-theme song of Since I Found You.
And later on, she launched her song on ASAP stage with her loveteam Inigo Pascual.

Last July 7, 2018, Racal launched her very first album entitled "Stellar" at the SM North Edsa Skydome with Migz Haleco, Sue Ramirez and her loveteam Inigo Pascual as her special guests, she performed all of her songs in the album, "Hi Crush", "Love Is Easy", "Tayo Na Di Tayo", "Ikaw Lang Sapat Na" and a rock version of "Tala". Her album is now available in all digital stores nationwide.

In October 2018, she interpreted the official entry from the Himig Handog 2018 "Sugarol" written by Jan Sabili.

By the 2nd quarter of 2019, Racal released her new self-written single entitled "Abot Langit" in collaboration with Rico Blanco.

In 2020, Racal signed with a new music label, Balcony Entertainment and distributor, Sony Music Philippines. She released her first single, "Not For Me", in September under the new label.

On June 11, 2022, Racal released her sophomore album Ate Sandali, composed of 8 tracks including her lead single of the same title.

Personal life
Racal is currently in a relationship with musician Rico Blanco since March 24, 2019.

Filmography

Film

Television

Commercials

Discography

Studio album

Singles

Chart performance

Music Video Chart performance

Awards and nominations

References

External links

1997 births
Living people
Pinoy Big Brother contestants
Star Magic
Filipino film actresses
Filipino television actresses
ABS-CBN personalities
People from Davao del Norte
Visayan people
Star Music artists
21st-century Filipino actresses
21st-century Filipino women singers
21st-century Filipino singers
Sony Music Philippines artists